Mawa (also known as Mahwa, Mahoua) is an Afro-Asiatic language spoken in central Chad.

Notes

References
Hutchinson, Noelle, and Eric Johnson. 2006. A sociolinguistic survey of the Ubi language of Chad. SIL Electronic Survey Reports 2006-002. Dallas: SIL International. Online. URL: https://sil.org/silesr/abstract.asp?ref=2006-002.

Jungraithmayr, Herrmann. 1981b. Über die Mawa (Guera, Tschad) – Ethnographische und linguistische Notizen. In: I. Hofmann (ed.), Festschrift zum 60. Geburtstag von P. Anton Vorbichler, 47–70.

Roberts, James. 2009. Palatalization and Labialization in Mawa (Eastern Chadic). In: Rothmaler, Eva (ed.), Topics in Chadic Linguistics V, 129–140. Cologne: Rüdiger Köppe.

Roberts, James. 2013. The tone system of Mawa. In: Henry Tourneux (ed.), Topics in Chadic Linguistics VII, Cologne: Rüdiger Köppe.

East Chadic languages
Languages of Chad